Buccinulum mariae is a species of marine gastropod mollusc in the family Buccinidae. It was first described by Baden Powell in 1940. It is endemic to the waters of New Zealand.

Description

Buccinulum mariae are typically a dark reddish-brown colour, with some specimens exhibiting a lighter colour and darker spiral bands. The holotype of the species was 20 mm in height, with a diameter of between 10 and 75 mm, however specimens have been recorded as large as 26 millimetres in height.

Distribution
The species is Endemic to New Zealand.

References

Buccinidae
Gastropods described in 1940
Gastropods of New Zealand
Endemic fauna of New Zealand
Endemic molluscs of New Zealand
Molluscs of the Pacific Ocean
Taxa named by Arthur William Baden Powell